Joseph-Charles-Théodore Gervais (July 25, 1868 – February 18, 1940) was a doctor and politician in Quebec.

He was born in Berthier-en-haut, Quebec. He was first elected to the House of Commons of Canada in the 1917 federal election in the riding of Berthier as a Laurier Liberal and was re-elected in 1921. He was subsequently re-elected in the 1925 and 1926 elections from the riding of Berthier—Maskinongé before being elected in the 1930 federal election by Conservative Joseph Arthur Barrette.

Berthier was also mayor of the municipality of Berthierville for four years.

References

1868 births
1940 deaths
Members of the House of Commons of Canada from Quebec
Liberal Party of Canada MPs
Mayors of places in Quebec